Rodney Square is the public square and historic district in downtown Wilmington, Delaware, United States, named after American Revolutionary leader Caesar Rodney.  A large equestrian statue of Rodney by James E. Kelly formerly stood in the front of the square until it was removed in 2020.  The square was created in the early 20th century by John Jacob Raskob, who worked for Pierre S. du Pont.  The City Beautiful movement served as the inspiration for the effort.

In 1917, to make room for the Wilmington Public Library in the square, the 18th-century First Presbyterian Church was moved to Park Drive and the remains in the cemetery were reinterred in Wilmington and Brandywine Cemetery.

It was listed on the National Register of Historic Places in 2011, as the Rodney Square Historic District.

Events
 Clifford Brown Jazz Festival
 First Night Wilmington
 Saint Patrick's Day Parade
 Citizens Bank Caesar Rodney Half Marathon

Surrounding architecture

The eight blocks surrounding the square contain a number of downtown buildings:

Corporate headquarters

Current
 Chemours
 Wilmington Trust
 Bank of America Credit Card Division

Former
 American Viscose Company
 Atlas Powder Company
 Barnsdall Oil
 Delaware Trust
 DuPont
 Hercules Inc.
 MBNA

Transportation

Rodney Square serves as a bus stop for several DART First State bus routes including 2, 4, 6, 9, 10, 11, 13, 14, 18, 20, 25, and 301. From 1992 to December 2017, Rodney Square served as the main hub for DART First State buses in Wilmington. In December 2017, the state of Delaware under the direction of Governor John Carney eliminated the bus hub at Rodney Square by scattering stops throughout downtown Wilmington, removing 13 routes from stopping at the square. The decision to eliminate the hub was made in order to reduce congestion and overcrowding at Rodney Square. This action resulted in many riders having to walk multiple blocks to make transfers, and many of the new bus stops do not have shelters or benches. The Wilmington Transit Center was built as a new hub for DART First State buses adjacent to the Wilmington Train Station, opening in May 2020.

References

 Location coordinates from the USGS Geographic Names Information System (GNIS), feature ID 217603; use ID at search interface

External links

Downtown Wilmington
Wilmington Visitors Bureau
Wilmington City Government

DART First State
Historic districts in Wilmington, Delaware
Historic districts on the National Register of Historic Places in Delaware
National Register of Historic Places in Wilmington, Delaware
Neoclassical architecture in Delaware
Squares in the United States